Frenchy (formerly known as Full Love, Soldiers and The Eagle Path) is an upcoming action drama written, produced, edited, and directed by Jean-Claude Van Damme, who also stars in the film as the main character Frenchy. The film also features two of his children, Kristopher Van Varenberg and Bianca Bree.

The first edit of the film was screened under the former title The Eagle Path during a special distributor screening at the 2010 Cannes Film Festival to find a distribution company for a potential theatrical release, but with no success. For that reason, in 2012, parts of the film were reshot and scenes added, the film was renamed Soldiers. Two years after,  
a new cut of the film with a title change to Full Love, was shown during a special distributor screening at the 2014 Shanghai International Film Festival. In 2018, Van Damme attended the Cannes Film Festival again and unsuccessfully tried to find a theatrical distributor for the third time. In 2020, the film was re-edited and renamed again to Frenchy and is still in search of a distributor. In 2022 the movie under the original title The Eagle Path was still in search for a distributor.

Cast

Production

Filming
The first cut of Frenchy was filmed in Thailand in the summer of 2008 on a budget of $5 million. After unsuccessful special screening in Cannes, organized in 2010 in order to find a distributor for a potential theatrical release, additional footage was shot in 2012 in Sofia, Bulgaria.

Music
Composer Youssef Guezoum scored the film with additional songs produced by Clarence Jey and performed by Josef Gordon. Music Supervision by Clarence Jey.

References

External links
 
 
 Rodin Entertainment

Films directed by Jean-Claude Van Damme
Films produced by Jean-Claude Van Damme
Films with screenplays by Jean-Claude Van Damme
American crime drama films
Thai crime drama films
Hong Kong crime drama films
Upcoming English-language films
American action drama films
Films shot in Thailand
Upcoming films
Unreleased films